Paddle Pop  is a brand of ice confection products originally created by Streets, which is now is owned by the English multinational consumer goods company Unilever. It is sold in Australia, New Zealand, and a few other countries. It is held for eating by a wooden stick which protrudes at the base. The brand has a mascot known as the Paddle Pop Lion, or Max, who appears on the product wrapper.

Paddle Pops have been very popular since their launch by Streets in 1953, and the name has become one of the best known brands in Australia. It is Streets Icecream's biggest volume item with 70 million annual turnover.

History
Launched to the public in 1953, the brand had a 50-year anniversary in 2004 at which point it was one of the best known brands in Australia. The wooden stick holding the confection is known as a Paddle Pop stick (used commonly for arts and crafts and known also as a popsicle stick or craft stick).

In 1960, the brand's mascot was introduced, the Paddle Pop lion. 

In 1999, Paddle Pop was launched in Malaysia and Indonesia with a promotion that featured a thermochromic glow-in-the-dark plastic stick.

In 2005, there was a spin-off product which was the Paddle Pop flavour in a dairy snack form.  Paddle Pops is now available in 20 countries, although other countries may sell them under different brands from Streets' Heartbrand sister companies, Wall's and HB Ice Cream.

Paddle Pop Adventures, a Thai animated series, had its first release in late 2005. There are 12 movies for this series, as well as two other animations. Each part was originally released in separate episodes, but was condensed into dubbed movies for Australian audiences.

Streets came to media attention in 2010 when they reduced the size of the Paddle Pop by 15%. Streets claimed that this was to make them healthier but others attribute it to food inflation.

Varieties
Paddle Pop ice creams and ice blocks are available in box packs, in ice cream buckets, cups, and commonly in singular form inside freezer displays in stores.

Ice creams
 Strawberry
 Chocolate
 Banana
 Strawberry Milkshake
 Koala Choc Caramel (promoting the Australian wildlife rescue organisation WIRES)
 Rainbow
 Rainbow Swirl
 Vanilla Cup
 Choc Banana
 Blast from the Past (limited time, used retired flavours)
 Chocolate & Caramel (60 year anniversary release)

Indonesia exclusive
 Choco Magma (chocolate milk)
 Choco Lava (chocolate with creamy sauce)
 Fruit Slice Milk Melon
 Mochi Choco Vanilla

Retired
 Vanilla
 Caramel Choc
 Caramel Choc Dip
 Bionic Bubble Gum
 Choc-Mint Paw Print
 Mud Puddle
 Choc-Toff
 Flaky Choc Caramel
 Fruit Salad
 Vanilla with chocolate center
 Solar suar (orange and berry)
 Coffee
 Chocolate Banana Mini
 Munch Pops
 Dessert Log
 Lemon Split
 Double Bubblegum
 Banana Split (banana with chocolate tip)

Ice blocks
 Lemonade
 Twirly Pop
 Icy Twist
 Cyclone
 Tubes
 Tubes Minis
 Tornado Grape
 Big Yakoo
 Paddle Pop Spider-Man Strawberry
 Dragon Popper
 Icy Blast Off - Lemonade & Raspberry
 Paddle Pop "Icy Blast Off" Minions
 Twister Mermaid
 Paddle Pop Doraemon 
 Cola Blast
 Fun Orange
 Fruit Pop
 Banana Boat (also sold as Street's Monkey Banana)
 Trico (strawberry soursop and guava flavoured, Indonesia exclusive)
 Ocean Freeze (not available in Australia)
 Dino Freeze (not available in Australia)
 Lemon Blast (Indonesia exclusive)
 Juice Jets (retired)
 Cracker Jets (retired)

Other
 Chocolate Frozen Thick Shake
 Shaky Shake
 Jiggly Jelly Bubble Gum
 Chocolate Flavoured Frozen Desert
 Apple Grape Blast (jelly)
 Mini fruits (orange mango & passion pine)
 Mini milks (strawberry, chocolate)
 Marshmallow Twister (Indonesia exclusive)

References

Products introduced in 1953
Ice cream brands
Unilever brands
Australian brands
Australian confectionery
Food advertising characters
Male characters in advertising
Cartoon mascots
Fictional lions
Lion mascots
Mascots introduced in 1960